Juncus uncialis is a species of rush known by the common names twelfth rush and inch-high rush. It is native to the western United States, where it is known from wet habitat such as vernal pools. This is a petite annual herb forming dense clumps of hair-thin green stems no more than 3 or 4 centimeters high. The inflorescence is made up of a single tiny flower atop each stem. The flower has several reddish segments about 2 to 5 millimeters long wrapped around the developing fruit.

External links
Jepson Manual Treatment
Photo gallery

uncialis
Flora of North America
Plants described in 1890